Gornja Dubrava ("Upper Dubrava") is one of the districts of Zagreb, Croatia. 
It is located in the northeastern part of the city and has 61,841 inhabitants (2011 census).

List of neighborhoods in Gornja Dubrava
 Branovec-Jalševec
 Čučerje
 Dankovec
 Dubec
 Dubrava-Središte
 Gornja Dubrava
 Granešina
 Granešinski Novaki
 Klaka
 Miroševec
 Novoselec
 Oporovec
 Poljanice
 Studentski grad
 Trnovčica
 Žuti brijeg

References

External links
 Official web site of Dubrava

Districts of Zagreb